Pedankalam or Peda Ankalam is a village and panchayat in Seethanagaram mandal of Vizianagaram district in Andhra Pradesh, India.

Pedankalam Anicut
Peda Ankalam Anicut was constructed across River Suvarnamukhi, a tributary of River Nagavali near Pedankalam village. The project is aimed to irrigate a total ayacut of 8,257 acres in the (i) Vizianagaram district (Balijipeta Mandal) - 6,617 Acres and (ii) Srikakulam district (Vangara Mandal) – 

The project was constructed during 1975-79. It utilizes 1.073 TMC of the available water. The project cost is  240 Lakhs.

Demographics
According to Indian census, 2001, the demographic details of Pedankalam village is as follows:
 Total Population: 	1,173 in 264 Households
 Male Population: 	577 and Female Population: 	596
 Children Under 6-years of age: 	143 (Boys - 	70 and Girls - 	73)
 Total Literates: 	408

References

Villages in Vizianagaram district